Richmond Villa is a heritage-listed home located in , an inner city suburb of Sydney, in the City of Sydney local government area of New South Wales, Australia. It was designed by the notable colonial architect Mortimer Lewis in the Gothic Revival style. The villa was listed on the City of Sydney local heritage register on 14 December 2012 and is located adjacent to Glover cottages, which are listed on the New South Wales State Heritage Register.

History and description

Richmond Villa is now located on top of an artificial rock shelf or escarpment along the east side of Kent Street, facing west. This rock shelf may have been created by stone quarrying that took place between 1810 and the 1830s. It soon became the site of stone cottages, some of which still survive, but Richmond Villa started its life in a very different place.

In 1849, Mortimer Lewis bought three plots of land behind Macquarie Street, facing The Domain. On this property he built his own home, which he called Richmond Villa. It is one of the few examples of Lewis's residential work, since his buildings were generally non-residential. He designed Richmond Villa in a Gothic Revival style, as he had done with Bronte House. The ground floor contained a high veranda with zig-zag lattice-like detailing which contrasted with the building's asymmetrical plan and fenestration.

The house was used as an annex to NSW Parliament House from 1880 to 1975. It was then dismantled to make way for extensions to Parliament House, and re-erected in Kent Street, Millers Point, in 1977.

It is the current office of the Society of Australian Genealogists.

Heritage listing
On 14 December 2012 the house was listed on the City of Sydney local heritage register with the following statement of significance:

On 21 March 1978 the house was listed on the (now defunct) Register of the National Estate.

See also

Australian residential architectural styles

References

External links

  at Sydney Living Museums

New South Wales places listed on the defunct Register of the National Estate
Houses in Millers Point, New South Wales
New South Wales Heritage Database
1851 establishments in Australia
Houses completed in 1851
Mortimer Lewis buildings
Gothic Revival architecture in Sydney